Montpeyrouxis a commune in the Aveyron department in southern France. Residents of the commune are referred to as Montpeirosiens.

In 1790–1794, the commune absorbed Seignour Delcros, Engalenc and Esparou; in 1832, it absorbed Le Bousquet, Brionnès and Crozillac.

Population

See also
Communes of the Aveyron department

References

Communes of Aveyron
Aveyron communes articles needing translation from French Wikipedia